Reseda viridis is a species of plant in the family Resedaceae. It is endemic to Socotra. Its natural habitat is rocky areas.

References

viridis
Endemic flora of Socotra
Least concern plants
Plants described in 1882
Taxonomy articles created by Polbot
Taxa named by Isaac Bayley Balfour